Route 111 is a highway in northwestern Missouri.  Its northern terminus is at U.S. Route 136 in Rock Port; its southern terminus is at U.S. Route 59 in Oregon. The entire length of Route 111 is part of the Lewis and Clark Trail.

Major intersections

Auxiliary route
Spur Route 111 is a  spur route which connects to U.S. Route 59.  It lies entirely within the city of Craig.

References 

111
Transportation in Holt County, Missouri
Transportation in Atchison County, Missouri